The 2018–19 season was Fleetwood Town's 111th season in their history and fifth consecutive season in League One. Along with League One, the club also participated in the FA Cup, EFL Cup and EFL Trophy.

The season covers the period from 1 July 2018 to 30 June 2019.

Transfers

Transfers in

Transfers out

Loans in

Loans out

Competitions

Friendlies
Fleetwood Town announced a pre-season friendlies against Salford City, STK Fluminense Šamorín, Tranmere Rovers, Morecambe and Chorley.

League One

League table

Results summary

Results by matchday

Matches
On 21 June 2018, the League One fixtures for the forthcoming season were announced.

FA Cup

The first round draw was made live on BBC by Dennis Wise and Dion Dublin on 22 October. The draw for the second round was made live on BBC and BT by Mark Schwarzer and Glenn Murray on 12 November. The third round draw was made live on BBC by Ruud Gullit and Paul Ince from Stamford Bridge on 3 December 2018.

EFL Cup

On 15 June 2018, the draw for the first round was made in Vietnam. The second round draw was made from the Stadium of Light on 16 August.

EFL Trophy
On 13 July 2018, the initial group stage draw bar the U21 invited clubs was announced.

References

Fleetwood Town F.C. seasons
Fleetwood Town